Pilea jamesonia is a species of plant in the family Urticaceae. It is endemic to Ecuador.  Its natural habitat is subtropical or tropical moist montane forests.

References

Endemic flora of Ecuador
jamesonia
Near threatened plants
Taxonomy articles created by Polbot